IRIS (Incorporated Research Institutions for Seismology) is a university research consortium dedicated to exploring the Earth's interior through the collection and distribution of seismographic data. IRIS programs contribute to scholarly research, education, earthquake hazard mitigation, and the verification of a Comprehensive Nuclear-Test-Ban Treaty. Support for IRIS comes from the National Science Foundation, other federal agencies, universities, and private foundations. IRIS supports five major components, the Data Management Center (DMC), the Portable Array Seismic Studies of the Continental Lithosphere (PASSCAL), the Global Seismographic Network (GSN), the Transportable Array (USARRAY), and the Education and Public Outreach Program (EPO). IRIS maintains a Corporate Office in Washington, DC.

IRIS's Education and Public Outreach Program offers animations, videos, lessons, software, posters, and fact sheets to help teachers and the general public learn more about seismology and earth science and understand it better. The goal is to get more people interested in careers in geophysics.

IRIS is listed in the Registry of Research Data Repositories re3data.org.

History

In 1959, the United States Government launched a research effort aimed at improving national capabilities to detect and identify foreign nuclear explosions detonated underground and at high altitudes. The resultant World-Wide Standardized Seismograph Network (WWSSN) was a program successful beyond its original remit. It provided seismological data for its intended purpose as well as for the emerging concept of plate tectonics. Initially operated by the Defense Department, by 1973 operations were transferred to the U.S. Geological Survey. A collaboration with the IRIS Consortium began in 1984 as a result of a need to expand and succeed the WWSSN with the Global Seismographic Network (GSN). The GSN, originally funded entirely by the USGS under the National Earthquake Hazards Reduction Program (NEHRP), is now jointly supported by the National Science Foundation.

As of January 1, 2023, IRIS has merged with UNAVCO into the EarthScope Consortium, "a university consortium dedicated to transforming global geophysical research and education".

See also

Earthscope
Geophysics
Plate tectonics
POLARIS
Reflection seismology
Seismology
Seismometer
UNAVCO
Volcanology

References

External links

 Smith, S., IRIS – A University Consortium for Seismology, Reviews of Geophysics and Space Physics, Vol. 25, p. 1203, 1986.
 
 Aster, R., Beaudoin, B., Hole, J., Fouch, M., Fowler, J., James, D., and the PASSCAL Staff and Standing Committee, IRIS PASSCAL program marks 20 years of scientific discovery, EOS trans. AGU, 86, 26 April 2005.

Seismological observatories, organisations and projects